HMS Mignonette was a  that served with the Royal Navy during the Second World War. She served as an escort ship in the Battle of the Atlantic.

Background
The ship was commissioned on 31 August 1939 by Hall, Russell & Company from Aberdeen in Scotland.

War service
On 21 January 1945 she helped sink  alongside the destroyer .

Fate
She was sold in 1946. In 1948, she became the merchant ship Alexandrouplis. That same year, on 30 November 1948, she was lost at sea.

Citations

Sources

1941 ships
Flower-class corvettes of the Royal Navy